Potamonautes infravallatus is a species of crustacean in the family Potamonautidae. It is endemic to Tanzania.  Its natural habitat is rivers.

References

Fauna of Tanzania
Potamoidea
Freshwater crustaceans of Africa
Taxa named by Franz Martin Hilgendorf
Crustaceans described in 1898
Taxonomy articles created by Polbot